"Easy Breezy" is Utada's debut English single (16th overall). It is also the first single from Exodus, in which it also appears. For this release, they are using Island Def Jam as their label, under the name of simply Utada, rather than Hikaru Utada which was used for their Japanese releases. This was originally released as an exclusive download single, though was later released as a DVD single in Japan. This song has been used in several Nintendo DS endorsements featuring Utada. There was a promo single for Easy Breezy that was sent to radio stations that features an exclusive radio edit of the song. The cover is the same as for the DVD single. The single sold 2,731 copies in Korea.

Music video
The video for "Easy Breezy", directed by Jake Nava, depicts Utada in various locations, including a pool, their bedroom, and in a car (Ferrari Dino), all while celebrating their freedom from their former romantic interest.

Track listing

The Ultimix version is found on Ultimix 108 as track 3, remixed by Stacy Mier.

Charts
"Easy Breezy" - Oricon Sales Chart (Japan)

References

External links
 

Hikaru Utada songs
2004 singles
Music videos directed by Jake Nava
Songs used as jingles
Songs written by Hikaru Utada
2004 songs